József Szmodis was a Slovene Lutheran priest in Krašči in the 17th and 18th centuries in Hungary. He wrote a Lutheran hymnal in the Prekmurje dialect.

See also 
 István Kozel
 List of Slovene writers and poets in Hungary
 Old hymnal of Martjanci

Literature 
 Jože Alojz & Janez Sraka. Prekmurci in Prekmurje, Chicago 1984.

Slovenian writers and poets in Hungary
17th-century births
18th-century deaths
People from the Municipality of Cankova